Puteri Indonesia Pariwisata (literally translates into: "Princess Indonesia Tourism" or "Miss Supranational Indonesia") is one of the titles granted by the Puteri Indonesia beauty pageant. The winners of Puteri Indonesia Pariwisata represent Indonesia in Miss Supranational. The president-owner of Puteri Indonesia Pariwisata are The Royal Highest Family of Surakarta Sunanate, Princess Mooryati Soedibyo and Princess Putri Kuswisnuwardhani. Puteri Indonesia Pariwisata is traditionally crowned in March, alongside the celebration of International Women's Day.

The reigning Puteri Indonesia Pariwisata 2022 is Adinda Cresheilla of East Java, who was crowned on 27 May 2022 in Jakarta Convention Center. She represented Indonesia at the 13th edition of Miss Supranational beauty pageant.

History

In 2006 until 2022, 2nd Runner Up of Puteri Indonesia was given the Puteri Indonesia Pariwisata. Puteri Indonesia Pariwisata was started to choose the winner for Miss International 2007. After that, Puteri Indonesia Organization did not send Puteri Indonesia Pariwisata to international pageant. Started Puteri Indonesia 2010, the titleholders was sent to the International Beauty pageants, started with Alessandra Khadijah Usman at the Miss Asia Pacific World 2011 in Chile, following with Andi Tenri Gusti Harnum Utari Natassa was competed at the Miss Asia Pacific World 2012 in South Korea.

The first Puteri Indonesia Pariwisata to compete in Miss Supranational was Cokorda Istri Krisnanda Widani from Bali in 2013. The 2011 and 2012 winners (Alessandra Khadijah Usman and Andi Tenri Gusti Harnum Utari Natassa) competed in Miss Asia Pacific World. The participation of Indonesia in Miss Supranational were continuing by Intan Aletrino became Miss Supranational Indonesia 2016 by winning Puteri Indonesia Pariwisata 2016. Karina Nadila Niab was Miss Supranational Indonesia 2017 after winning Puteri Indonesia Pariwisata 2017, and since then the winner of Puteri Indonesia Pariwisata was automatically represent Indonesia to Miss Supranational till now.

In 2019, Joko Widodo announced the Puteri Indonesia as "National Intangible Cultural Heritage of Indonesia", which carries the values of Indonesian culture and society togetherness, to celebrate the role of women in the creative industry, environment, tourism, education and social awareness. In line with that, Angela Tanoesoedibjo the eldest daughter of media magnate MNC Group Hary Tanoesoedibjo and Miss Indonesia President and chief executive officer Liliana Tanaja Tanoesoedibjo chosen as The Deputy of Ministry of tourism and Creative Economy of The Republic of Indonesia by the President of Indonesia, Joko Widodo at the Istana Negara Palace in Central Jakarta. Start in 2023, Puteri Indonesia Pariwisata was given to the 1st Runner Up Puteri Indonesia.

Winners
The oldest woman to win Puteri Indonesia Pariwisata is Puteri Indonesia Pariwisata 2017, Karina Nadila Niab of East Nusa Tenggara, at 24 years old, 7 months and 10 days, while the youngest woman to win Puteri Indonesia Pariwisata is Puteri Indonesia Pariwisata 2011, Andi Tenri Gusti Harnum Utari Natassa of South Sulawesi, at 19 years old, 1 month and 26 days. The tallest Puteri Indonesia Pariwisata is Puteri Indonesia Pariwisata 2018, Wilda Octaviana Situngkir, of West Kalimantan at 5 feet and 10 inch (178 cm).

Many Puteri Indonesia Pariwisata winners have gone to pursue careers in the entertainment industry. Those who have been successful in the industry include Alessandra Khadijah Usman, Gresya Amanda Maaliwuga, Intan Aletrinö, Karina Nadila Niab, Wilda Octaviana Situngkir, Jihane Almira Chedid and Adinda Cresheilla

Gallery of winners 
The winners of Puteri Indonesia Pariwisata

Titleholders
This is a list of women who have the title of Puteri Indonesia Partiwisata.
Color key

Puteri Indonesia Pariwisata Title was given in 2006 until 2022 for the 2nd Runner Up Puteri Indonesia.

Start in 2023, the Puteri Indonesia Pariwisata is the title for 1st Runner Up Puteri Indonesia.

Number of wins by Province

Crossovers to other international pageants

Indonesia's Placement at Miss Supranational

Past International Pageant

Indonesia's Placement at Miss Asia Pacific World

See also
Puteri Indonesia
Puteri Indonesia Lingkungan
Puteri Indonesia Pariwisata (in Bahasa Indonesia)
Miss Supranational

Notes
Jihane Almira Chedid competed in Guess Girl Search South East Asia 2015 where she placed in Top 15, together with Puteri Indonesia 2017 alumni, Bunga Jelitha as the winner. She is also placed in Top 10 Nylon Magazine Face Off 2016.

References

Beauty pageants in Indonesia
Indonesia
Puteri Indonesia
Indonesian awards
Lists of award winners
Lists of women in beauty pageants